Anglican High School may refer to:
 Anglican High School (Grenada), a secondary girls' school in St. George's, Grenada
 Anglican High School, Singapore, a secondary school in Tanah Merah, Singapore